See also Battle of Reading (871), Siege of Reading (1642–1643)

The Battle of Reading took place on 9 December 1688 in Reading, Berkshire. It was one of only two substantial military actions in England during the Glorious Revolution (the other being at Wincanton), and was a decisive victory for forces loyal to William III of Orange. The victory was celebrated in Reading for many years.

Prelude 
On Wednesday 5 November 1688, William III, then the Prince of Orange and Stadtholder of the Holland, Zeeland, Utrecht, Gelderland, and Overijssel provinces of the Dutch Republic, landed in Devon at the head of a Dutch army in an attempt to wrest control of the country. Five weeks later, on 7 December, the Prince of Orange and a strong body of troops had reached Hungerford. While there, English supporters came into the town, including several hundred cavalry headed by northern lords.

After retreating from Salisbury, King James II's main force was stationed on Hounslow Heath. On Saturday 8 December, James sent Lord Halifax, Lord Nottingham, and Lord Godolphin to confer with William. Halifax presented James' proposals: that the points of dispute would be laid before Parliament; and that while Parliament deliberated, William's army would not come nearer than 30 miles from London. Halifax then handed a letter from James to William. William asked his English advisers to discuss the proposals. They met under the chairmanship of Lord Oxford and, after a long debate, advised rejection. William decided to negotiate and put counter proposals in writing for Halifax to deliver to James.

Battle 
James had posted an advance guard of 600 Irish Catholics under Patrick Sarsfield in Reading to stop the march of the Dutch towards London. As wild rumours – known as the Irish Fright – asserted they were planning to massacre the townsfolk, the inhabitants asked William for help. On Sunday 9 December, a relief force of 280 of William's dragoons was sent. Warned of the Jacobite positions, they attacked from an unexpected direction, and got into the centre of Reading, where Broad Street gives rise to one of the alternate names for this encounter. They were supported by Reading men shooting from windows. James' forces retreated in confusion; leaving an unknown number dead, with reports varying widely from twelve to fifty killed, depending on the account. The number of casualties for Williams' men is unknown however at least one is referred to as a Catholic officer. Many of the dead were buried in the churchyard of St Giles' Church.

The battle is described with blatant bias by Daniel Defoe in his A tour thro' the whole island of Great Britain. His is, however, one of the few contemporary accounts. Defoe, who had supported, and possibly fought for, the Duke of Monmouth in his earlier rebellion against James II was welcoming of the Dutch invasion. He describes how a squadron of "Irish dragoons" was routed by the "irresistible fury" of a Dutch force who chased many of the fleeing soldiers to nearby Twyford.

Aftermath 
James was already convinced that only Irish troops could be relied on to defend him, but this apparent defeat by an inferior force and the willingness of the people of Reading to support a Protestant revolt against him further signalled the insecurity of his position. Thus on Tuesday 11 December James fled London in an abortive attempt to escape. He eventually escaped to France, where he found the support of Louis XIV, and then Ireland, where most of the population supported him. His last hopes of regaining the throne were dashed with his defeat in the Williamite War in Ireland.

In light of proposals he had received from James while in Hungerford, William had decided not to immediately proceed to London, but to accept an invitation from the University of Oxford. On 11 December, William set off for Abingdon. On hearing of James's flight, he turned and headed down the Thames valley through Wallingford and Henley. He accepted the submission of the Jacobite troops he met on the way, arriving at Windsor on 14 December 1688.

Notes

References

Bibliography

Further reading 

1688 in England
Reading 1688
Battle of Reading 1688
Battle of Reading 1688
Battle of Reading 1688
Reading 1688
Glorious Revolution
17th century in Berkshire
Reading (1688)